Phyllonorycter jezoniella is a moth of the family Gracillariidae. It is known from Japan (the islands of Hokkaido and Honshu) and the Russian Far East.

The larvae feed on Acer mono. They mine the leaves of their host plant. The mine is ptychonomous and is situated in the centre of the lower surface of the leaf.

References

jezoniella
Moths of Asia
Moths described in 1931